Grêmio Recreativo Cultural Social Escola de Samba Mocidade Alegre, popularly known simply as Mocidade Alegre, is a samba school from São Paulo, Brazil.

History 

It arose through a group of men dressed as women who went out by the streets of the Central Region of São Paulo. This group was formed by Juarez Cruz, his brothers Salvador Cruz, Carlos Cruz and two more friends. The three brothers came from the town of Campos dos Goytacazes and lived in São Paulo since 1948. Because of a joke, alluding to two situations that raged in São Paulo at the recovery of trams and closing of brothels of the Bom Retiro district by the city, the merrymakers baptised the group in 1958 as "Block of the first moths retrieved from Bom Retiro". Until then, only men participated in the group. In 1963, for the first time a woman paraded, a year when its members came out in clown costumes by Avenida São João.

In 1964, French François Bellot, director of Supermarket Peg Pag, where Juarez Cruz worked since 1955, requested the presence of the group to liven up a feast at his residence. From there, the supermarket began to help the carnival block. By suggestion of François Bellot, in 1965 the group, for the first time counting the women and children of their founders, participated in the Carnival of Saints, where there was a street carnival organized, unlike what happened in the capital.

Classifications

References

External links
Official site

Samba schools of São Paulo
1967 establishments in Brazil